Michelle Carey (born 5 May 1999) is an Irish field hockey player. She competed in the 2020 Summer Olympics. She currently studies engineering at UCD.

References

External links
 Michelle Carey at Hockey Ireland
 
 
 
 

1999 births
Living people
Field hockey players at the 2020 Summer Olympics
Irish female field hockey players
Olympic field hockey players of Ireland